Rabbit in the Moon is an American electronic music group that formed in 1991. Their style draws from psychedelic trance, house music and breakbeat, along with other diverse influences.

History
Formed in 1992 in Tampa, Florida, the group consisted of performer/singer Bunny and producer David Christophere. 

After several singles released on Monk and David Christophere's Hallucination Recordings label under the name Anarch-E, their first success as producers came in 1993 with the release of the "Phases of an Out of Body Experience" single on Hardkiss Records.  As remixers, Rabbit in the Moon has reworked songs by artists such as Garbage ("Queer" and "Milk"), Tori Amos ("Precious Things"), Sarah McLachlan ("Fear", "Possession"), Orbital ("Are We Here?"), Smashing Pumpkins ("The End Is the Beginning Is the End"), Goldie ("Inner City Life"), White Zombie ("Blood, Milk and Sky") and Delerium ("Euphoria").

Rabbit in the Moon has also collaborated with Humate and in 1994 they released the Hemispheres E.P.

Throughout their career, Rabbit in the Moon toured extensively in the United States playing shows at venues and raves.

The Rabbit in the Moon Remixes Volume 2 CD came with a liner note stating that there was a new album to be released in summer of 2001. The album never materialized. Because of Monk's departure, questions were raised as to whether the band was breaking up, but this was not the case.

DJ Monk leaves 
DJ Monk left the group in 2002. A new song called "Time Bomb" surfaced in 2003, with David Christophere and Bunny as the only producers on the track.

In 2005, they made the song "Came and Conkered", inspired by and featured in the soundtrack of the 2005 video game Conker: Live & Reloaded. They were asked by Nile Rodgers to create music for the Xbox remake of the game.

Early in 2007, a countdown to a new album appeared on the band's MySpace page, putting the release date in April 2007. The album was ultimately released on July 10, 2007. It features two discs: one, a collection of past singles and newer material in audio CD format; the other, a collection of music videos and live performances from various festivals and concerts in DVD format. The record is called "Decade", and was released on Contagious Musiq / Southbeat Records.

In 2008, on the second night of the Annual World DJ Festival in Seoul, South Korea, frontman Bunny was injured when a glass bottle thrown by someone in the crowd hit his left eye, lacerating his retina, lens, and skin, and severely damaging his vision. Friends and fans throughout the electronic dance music community rallied to raise money to help him pay for his medical expenses.

, Rabbit in the Moon announced on their MySpace page that they were working on a new double album.

On March 27, 2010, Rabbit in the Moon performed at the Ultra Music Festival in Miami.  David Christophere was not seen at this show, fueling rumors he left the band and of an imminent band break up.  David Christophere's last Rabbit in the Moon show was New Year's Eve 2009.

The two have not performed a show together since. Bunny has been performing in several countries under the title BUNNY or Bunny Live.

David Christophere produces music and DJ from his home base in Los Angeles.

Reunion 
On August 31, 2013, the group played Firestone Live in Orlando, FL.

On December 16, 2015, Ultra Music Festival in Miami announced on their lineup of 2016 edition the appearance of Rabbit in the Moon. The group performed at Electric Daisy Carnival in Orlando in November, 2016.

The group played at Ultra Music Festival Miami  2017 and 2018. As well as Ultra Korea, Insomniac Countdown , Freaknight Seattle, and the great salt air Utah Das Energi festival.

Selected discography 
Original productions and singles:
Out of Body Experience/Freak to the Beat (Hallucination 12") (1993)
Phases of an Out Of Body Experience (Hardkiss 12") (1994)
 Untitled/The EP that Never Was (Limited Edition Hallucination 12") (1995)
 Deeper (Limited Edition Hallucination 12") (1997)
Rabbit in the Moon Remixes Volume 1 (Hallucination 3x12" and CD) (1998)
Floori.d.a (Hallucination 2x12" and CD Maxi) (1999)
Rabbit in the Moon Remixes Volume 2 (Hallucination 3x12" and CD) (1999)
9ine Eleven Dub (White Label) (2002)
Time Bomb (White Label) (2002)
Decade Southbeat Records (2007)
Blue Monday on Ceremony – A New Order Tribute (24 Hour Service Station) (2009)
Pheet Original release (dec 2016)
 Let's Dance Remake release with live video (Jan 2017)
 Seven Loves Electro EP (Insomniac Music / Thumper Music - limited Release vinyl 12" and Digital)(August 2017)

Remixes
 Velocity, "Lust" Desirable mix (Superstition)
 Orbital, "Are We Here" RITM's Oral Mix & Laconic Dub (London/FFRR)
 Sarah McLachlan, "Possession, Fear & Fear of Possession" R.I.T.M. rmxs (Arista)
 God Within, "The Phoenix" R.I.T.M. river & rain rmx (Hardkiss)
 Aquarhythms, "Heart Sequence" RITMs Moveable Feast Mix ) (Astralwerks)
 (orig. released as Ether "BodyJazz / Bodyfusion" on Aquarhythms
 Rabbit in the Moon/Humate, "East" R.I.T.M.'s southern stimulation (Superstition/RisingHigh)
 Cosmic Baby, "Cosmic Greets Florida" R.I.T.M. greets berlin & 7 am pacific rmxs (Logic)
 Nightripper, "Tone Exploitation" R.I.T.M. exploitation rmx (ESP)
 Astral Pilot, "Electro Acupuncture" RITM's Transcutaneous Electrical Nerve Stimulation (Harthouse)
 Garbage, "Queer" R.I.T.M.'s Heftybag mix and F.T.F.O.I. mix (Geffen/Almo Sounds)
 Planet Soul, "Set U Free" R.I.T.M.'s Moon Spirits dub (Strictly Rhythm)
 Goldie, "Inner City Life" R.I.T.M. mixes (London/FFRR)
 White Zombie, "More Human Than Human" (Geffen)
 White Zombie, "Blood, Milk & Sky" RITM's Subterranean Mix (Geffen)
 Garbage, "Stupid Girl" (Geffen/Almo Sounds)
 Keoki, "Caterpillar" R.I.T.M.'s disco 2001 mix (Moonshine)
 BT & Tori Amos, "Blue Skies" R.I.T.M.'s Fathomless mix (Kinetic/Perfecto)
 Garbage, "Milk" R.I.T.M.'s Got It, Butchered Vegas and Udder mixes (Geffen/Almo)
 Delerium, "Euphoria" (firefly) R.I.T.M.'s Divine Gothic Disco Mix & Dub (Netwerk)
 Healy & Amos, "Argentina" R.I.T.M.'s Helium mix (Positiva)
 TDF (feat. Eric Clapton), "Ripstop" R.I.T.M.'s Creamy Funkshunal mix (Reprise)
 Smashing Pumpkins, "The End Is The Beginning Is The End" RITM's Melancholy & The Infinite Madness Mix & Dub (Warner Bros.)
 Banco De Gaia, "Drunk As A Monk" R.I.T.M.'s Brass Monkey mix (Mammoth)
 Love & Rockets, "R.I.P. 20C" R.I.T.M.'s D.eath M.etal T.echno mix & R.I.T.M.'s R.I.P.ella (Red Ant)
 Stone Roses vs. RITM "Fool's Gold" RITM's Message To The Majors & Straight Beat Mixes (Jive Electro)
 Stone Roses vs. RITM "I Wanna Be adored" RITM's Acid Hacienda V2.1, Sex EFX & 909, For The Love Of Acid Mix & LunaSol's Acid Hacienda (Jive Electro)
 Planet Perfecto (Paul Oakenfold) "Bullet In The Gun 2000" RITM's Bloodhound Gangbangers & Spooky Red Ribbon Mixes (Perfecto)

References

External links
 
 DJ Monk - Founding R.I.T.M. Member ('92-'02)
 Rabbit in the Moon - Official Myspace Site
 BunnyInYourFace - Bunny's Official Site

Remixers
Club DJs
American house music groups
Electronic music groups from Florida
Musical groups from Tampa, Florida